Too Big to Fail is a 2011 American biographical drama television film directed by Curtis Hanson and written by Peter Gould, based on Andrew Ross Sorkin's 2009 non-fiction book Too Big to Fail: The Inside Story of How Wall Street and Washington Fought to Save the Financial System—and Themselves. The film aired on HBO on May 23, 2011. It received 11 nominations at the 63rd Primetime Emmy Awards; Paul Giamatti's portrayal of Ben Bernanke earned him the Screen Actors Guild Award for Outstanding Performance by a Male Actor in a Miniseries or Television Movie at the 18th Screen Actors Guild Awards.

Plot summary
Too Big to Fail chronicles the 2008 financial meltdown, focusing on the actions of U.S. Treasury Secretary Henry Paulson and Ben Bernanke, Chairman of the Federal Reserve System, to contain the problems during the period of August 2008 to October 13, 2008. The film starts with clips of news reports about the mortgage industry crisis and the forced sale of the troubled Bear Stearns to JPMorgan Chase, with Fed guarantees.

With Bear Stearns out of the picture, short sellers have turned their attention on Lehman Brothers. In need of capital, CEO Dick Fuld reluctantly fires COO Joe Gregory and CFO Erin Callan, naming Bart McDade as the new president and COO. McDade begins to successfully negotiate a deal with Korean investors, hinging on the condition that Lehman's toxic real estate is excluded. The deal falls through, however, when Fuld's pride gets the best of him and he tries to coerce the Koreans into accepting the real estate assets.

Paulson is adamant that the government will not subsidize anymore acquisitions, but it becomes clear the most promising buyer for Lehman, Bank of America, is uninterested without Fed involvement. Paulson and President of the Federal Reserve Bank of New York Timothy Geithner gather the leaders of the biggest banks, including Goldman Sachs CEO Lloyd Blankfein, JPMorgan Chase CEO Jamie Dimon, and Morgan Stanley CEO John Mack, to convince them to underwrite the deal themselves. During a break in negotiations, another threatened firm, Merrill Lynch, approaches Bank of America to buy them instead, which Paulson tacitly okays. With Bank of America purchasing Merrill Lynch, the only other buyer is British firm Barclays, but their involvement is blocked by British banking regulators. Lehman collapses and is forced into bankruptcy. Meanwhile, insurance firm AIG also begins to fail.

Lehman's collapse affects the entire financial market, and the stock market goes into freefall. Blankfein, Mack, and General Electric CEO Jeffrey Immelt inform Paulson they are unable to do business, and French Finance Minister Christine Lagarde warns him that he must not allow AIG to fail, as the crisis is affecting Europe as well. Unlike Lehman, the Treasury rescues AIG with an $85 billion loan.

Bernanke argues that the Congress must pass legislation to authorize any continued intervention by the Fed or the Treasury. With the availability of credit drying up, Paulson's plan is to buy the toxic assets from the banks to take the risk off their books and increase their cash reserves. Bernanke and Paulson lobby Congress, with Bernanke emphasizing the potential of fallout worse than the Great Depression if they fail to act. The committee of representatives appear close to agreeing, when U.S. Senator and Presidential candidate John McCain, with great fanfare, announces that he is suspending his campaign and returning to Washington to work on the legislation, polarizing the Republicans and Democrats on the issue.  Paulson has to threaten McCain not to interfere and beg the Democrats, led by Speaker of the House Nancy Pelosi, not to back away from the negotiations. After a wave of panic and personal haranguing from President George W. Bush, the legislation passes on a second attempt and the Troubled Asset Relief Program (TARP) is created.

Paulson's team realizes that buying toxic assets will take too long, leaving direct capital injections to the banks as their only option to use TARP to get credit flowing again. Along with FDIC Chair Sheila Bair, Paulson informs the banks that they will receive mandatory capital injections. The banks eventually agree, but Paulson's staff laments that the parties who caused the crisis are being allowed to dictate the terms of how they should use the billions with which they are being bailed out. In private conference, Bernanke and Paulson lament that, although the intent of TARP is for the banks to use the loan money to restore credit for ordinary consumers, the legislation stops short of forcing them to do so.

An epilogue notes that the banks did not, in fact, use the loan money as intended, but instead returned it at their earliest opportunity, and the stock market still crashed and was followed by a rash of home foreclosures.  Nevertheless, bank mergers continued in the wake of the crisis, and now only ten financial institutions hold 77% of all U.S. banking assets and have been declared too big to fail.

Cast
The cast includes the following:

 William Hurt as Henry Paulson (U.S. Treasury Secretary and former Chairman and CEO, Goldman Sachs)
 Edward Asner as Warren Buffett (Primary shareholder, Chairman and CEO, Berkshire Hathaway)
 Billy Crudup as Timothy Geithner (President of the Federal Reserve Bank of New York)
 Paul Giamatti as Ben Bernanke (Chairman of the Federal Reserve)
 Topher Grace as Jim Wilkinson (Chief of Staff, U.S. Treasury Department)
 Matthew Modine as John Thain (Chairman and CEO, Merrill Lynch)
 Cynthia Nixon as Michele Davis (Assistant Secretary of the Treasury for Public Relations and Director of Policy Planning)
 Michael O'Keefe as Chris Flowers (Chairman and CEO, J.C. Flowers & Co.)
 Bill Pullman as Jamie Dimon (Chairman and CEO, JPMorgan Chase)
 Tony Shalhoub as John Mack (Chairman and CEO, Morgan Stanley)
 James Woods as Dick Fuld (Chairman and CEO, Lehman Brothers)
 Ayad Akhtar as Neel Kashkari (Assistant Secretary of the Treasury for International Economics and Development)

 Kathy Baker as Wendy Paulson (Wife of Henry Paulson)
 Amy Carlson as Erin Callan (CFO, Lehman Brothers)
 Evan Handler as Lloyd Blankfein (Chairman and CEO, Goldman Sachs)
 John Heard as Joe Gregory (President and COO, Lehman Brothers)
 Dan Hedaya as Rep. Barney Frank (Chairman of the U.S. House Financial Services Committee (D-MA))
 Peter Hermann as Christopher Cox (Chairman of the U.S. Securities and Exchange Commission)
 Chance Kelly as Bart McDade (President and COO, Lehman Brothers)
 Tom Mason as Bob Willumstad (Chairman and CEO, AIG)
 Ajay Mehta as Vikram Pandit (CEO, Citigroup)
 Tom Tammi as Jeffrey Immelt (CEO, General Electric)
 Laila Robins as Christine Lagarde (French Finance Minister)
 Victor Slezak as Greg Curl (Director of Planning, Bank of America)
 Joey Slotnick as Dan Jester (Retired Goldman Sachs banker and newly appointed Paulson Advisor)
 Casey Biggs as Richard Kovacevich (Chairman, Wells Fargo & Company)
 Steve Tom as Sen. Chris Dodd (D-CT)
 Bud Jones as Sen. Harry Reid (D-NV)
 Jonathan Freeman as Sen. Richard Shelby (R-AL)
 Linda Glick as Congresswoman Nancy Pelosi (Speaker of the House of Representatives (D-CA))
 Patricia Randell as Sheila Bair (Chairman, Federal Deposit Insurance Corporation)
 George Taylor as Sir Callum McCarthy (Chairman of the Financial Services Authority)

Reception

Critical reception
On review aggregator website Rotten Tomatoes, the film holds an approval rating of 74%, based on 27 reviews, and an average rating of 6/10. On Metacritic, the movie received a weighted average score of 67/100 from 17 reviews, indicating "generally favorable reviews".

The A.V. Club gave the film a B rating.

Awards and nominations

Home media
The DVD was released on June 12, 2012.

See also

 The Big Short
 Margin Call
 The Last Days of Lehman Brothers
 Glengarry Glen Ross
 The Hummingbird Project
 Better Call Saul, a TV series written by Peter Gould with a significant banking subplot

Notes

References

External links

 HBO Films: Too Big To Fail
 

2011 films
2011 biographical drama films
2010s American films
2010s business films
2010s English-language films
2010s political drama films
American biographical drama films
American business films
American drama television films
American political drama films
Biographical films about businesspeople
Biographical films about politicians
Biographical television films
Cultural depictions of businesspeople
Cultural depictions of politicians
Cultural depictions of American men
Films about financial crises
Films based on non-fiction books
Films directed by Curtis Hanson
Films scored by Marcelo Zarvos
Films set in 2008
Films set in the Great Recession
Films shot in New York City
Films with screenplays by Peter Gould
HBO Films films
Television films based on books
Wall Street films